S34 may refer to:

Aviation 
 Blériot-SPAD S.34, a French biplane 
 Plains Airport, in Sanders County, Montana, United States
 Sikorsky S-34, an American sesquiplane
 Skyfly S-34 Skystar, a Swiss ultralight

Naval vessels 
 
 , a torpedo boat of the Imperial German Navy
 
 , a submarine of the United States Navy

Other uses 
 County Route S34 (California)
 Sulfur-34, an isotope of sulfur